Nicholas Edward Francis Luck (born 28 June 1978) is an English racing broadcaster, who previously presented Channel 4 Racing on Channel 4. 

He appeared on Racing UK at its launch in 2004 after 18 months as part of the original Racing Channel team and was a presenter on its inaugural broadcast. He has hosted all major events for the channel including the Derby, Grand National and Cheltenham Festival and presents the weekly programme Luck On Sunday.  

He is part of the NBC Breeders Cup team and is eight times Horserace Writers' & Photographers' Association Broadcaster of the Year. He is a regular contributor to the Evening Standard, Sunday Telegraph and Horse & Hound magazine. 

On the occasion of Luck's birthday in June 2022 Kenny Rice, his frequent colleague on NBC, commented that ‘if it isn’t a national holiday in the UK, it should be’.

In 2017, he became the BBC Equestrian commentator taking over from Mike Tucker, and has since covered the Olympia Horse Show, Badminton Horse Trials, Burghley Horse Trials and the Olympic Games for the BBC.

The Nick Luck Daily podcast is available on a number of platforms 

He was a member of British horseracing’s Whip Consultation Steering Group which in mid-2022  produced 20 recommendations relating to the use of the whip in British racing, all of which were approved by the Board of the British Horseracing Authority (BHA) and were published with other review documentation on 12 July 2022. 

Nick Luck attended King's College London and studied French.

References

External links
Ed Chamberlin will move from Sky Sports to front ITV Racing from 2017
Channel 4 Racing team saddle up to ride off into Cheltenham sunset

1978 births
Living people
British horse racing writers and broadcasters
People educated at Harrow School